Shift may refer to:

Art, entertainment, and media

Gaming
 Shift (series), a 2008 online video game series by Armor Games
 Need for Speed: Shift, a 2009 racing video game
 Shift 2: Unleashed, its 2011 sequel

Literature
 Shift (novel), a 2010 alternative history book by Tim Kring and Dale Peck
 Shift (novella), a 2013 science fiction book, part two of the Silo trilogy by Hugh Howey
 Shift the Ape, a character in The Chronicles of Narnia novel series

Music
 Shift (Nasum album), 2004
 Shift (The Living End album)
 Shift (music), a change of level in music
 Shift (string technique), a finger movement from one position to another on the same string

Other uses in arts, entertainment, and media
 Shift (magazine), a former Canadian technology and culture magazine
 Shift (MSNBC), an online live-streaming video network
 Shift (sculpture), an outdoor sculpture by American artist Richard Serra located in King City, Ontario, Canada

Business
 Shift (business), an online, peer-to-peer, marketplace for buying and selling used cars
 SHIFT (company), a German company producing the Shiftphone
 SHIFT Inc., a Japanese software testing company

Linguistics 
 Language shift, the process in which a community of speakers shift to speaking a different language
 Shifting (syntax), a syntactic process
 Sound shift, also known as sound shifting or sound change
 Vowel shift

Mathematics and computing 
 Barrel shifter, a digital circuit implementing bit shifts
 Bit shift, an operation treating a value as a sequence of binary digits
 Arithmetic shift
 Circular shift, often used in cryptography
 Logical shift
 Shift key, a key on a computer keyboard or typewriter
 Shift operator, a linear operator in mathematics

Sports
Shift (ice hockey), a group of players in ice hockey
Infield shift, a defensive alignment in baseball and softball

Other uses 
 Shift (clothing), a simple kind of undergarment or dress
 Shift (weapon), an improvised knife used as a weapon
 Gear shift, a lever to change gear in a vehicle
 Paradigm shift, a change in basic assumptions within the ruling theory of science
 Blueshift, any decrease in wavelength, with a corresponding increase in frequency, of an electromagnetic wave
 Redshift, a phenomenon that occurs when light seen coming from an object that is moving away is proportionally increased in wavelength, or shifted, to the red end of the spectrum
 Shapeshifting, a common theme in mythology, folklore, and fairy tales
 Shift vector, in ADM formalism of General Relativity
 Shift work, an employment practice
 Shifting, Hiberno-English slang for making out
 Tax shift, a fiscal policy
 Reality shifting, the spiritual practice of "transferring" or "shifting" one's awareness to a fictional universe or a parallel universe.

See also  
 
 
 Shifter (disambiguation)
 The Shift (disambiguation)